John George "Jack" Wentz (March 4, 1863 – September 14, 1907) was a right-handed second baseman who played in one game for the Louisville Colonels in 1891. He was born John George Werntz.

Wentz appeared in his lone big league game on April 15, 1891, at the age of 28. He had four at-bats, collecting one hit for a .250 batting average. In the field, he committed two errors for a .667 fielding percentage.

Wentz also spent a few years in the minors, until at least 1904.

Following his death, he was interred at St. Louis Cemetery in Louisville.

References

1863 births
1907 deaths
Louisville Colonels players
Baseball players from Louisville, Kentucky
19th-century baseball players
Minor league baseball managers
Emporia Reds players
Dallas Hams players
Galveston Sand Crabs players
Peoria Canaries players
Houston Mud Cats players
Washington Senators (minor league) players
Evansville Hoosiers players
Marinette (minor league baseball) players
Menominee (minor league baseball) players
Charleston Seagulls players
Macon Central City players
Macon Hornets players
Kansas City Cowboys (minor league) players
Memphis Lambs players
Memphis Giants players
Evansville Black Birds players
Norfolk Braves players
Norfolk Jewels players
Oswego Grays players
Chattanooga Lookouts players
Baton Rouge Cajuns players
Shreveport Giants players
Wheeling Stogies players
Hattiesburg (minor league baseball) players
Burials at St. Louis Cemetery, Louisville